Isotricha intestinalis is a species of holotrich protozoa in the class Litostomatea.

Description
Isotricha intestinalis can be 200 micrometers long, and is distinguishable by its mouth position. They are the largest protozoans present in the rumen of sheep.

This species has microbody-like organelles, and a highly granular appearance.

References

Litostomatea
Species described in 1859